The 2012–13 Genoa C.F.C. season is the club's sixth consecutive Serie A season of the football. This article lists its season results, transfers and statistics.

Current squad

Main transfers and loans

Summer 2012

In

Out

Winter 2012–13

In

Out

Competitions

Serie A

League table

Matches

Appearances and goals

|-
! colspan="10" style="background:#dcdcdc; text-align:center"| Goalkeepers

|-
! colspan="10" style="background:#dcdcdc; text-align:center"| Defenders

|-
! colspan="10" style="background:#dcdcdc; text-align:center"| Midfielders

|-
! colspan="10" style="background:#dcdcdc; text-align:center"| Forwards

|-
! colspan="10" style="background:#dcdcdc; text-align:center"| Players transferred out during the season

Goal scorers 
12 goals
  Marco Borriello

5 goals
  Ciro Immobile

4 goals
  Boško Janković
  Andrea Bertolacci

3 goals
  Juraj Kucka

2 goals
  Antonio Floro Flores

1 goal
  Marco Rigoni
  Daniele Portanova
  Alexander Merkel
  Andreas Granqvist
  Matuzalém
  Luca Antonelli
  Eros Pisano
  Said Ahmed Said

References

External links
 http://eufo.de

Genoa C.F.C. seasons
Genoa